"Old Toy Trains" (sometimes titled "Little Toy Trains") is a Christmas song written and originally recorded by Roger Miller. It was released in late 1967 as a single for Smash Records. It was adapted in French (title "Petit garçon") by Graeme Allwright in 1968.

History
Roger Miller wrote "Old Toy Trains" in 1967 for his son, Dean Miller. Released on Smash Records late in the year, the song ended an eight-year ban on Christmas single releases by the label.

Critical reception
An uncredited review in Billboard gave Roger Miller's original version a positive review, saying that "Miller has composed one of his most moving and touching ballads for all ages which he performs to perfection."

Other versions
Glen Campbell recorded the song for his 1968 album That Christmas Feeling.

Raffi recorded the song for his 1983 album Raffi's Christmas Album.

The Statler Brothers recorded the song for their 1985 album Christmas Present.

Toby Keith covered the song for the 2000 multi-artist album A Country Christmas 2000. Keith's rendition spent two weeks on the Hot Country Songs charts that year, peaking at number 57.

Two years later, Universal South Records released a version that incorporated Roger Miller's original vocals with those of Dean Miller.

Scott Miller recorded the song for his 2010 EP Christmas Gift.

Violinist André Rieu performed the song with vocalists Mirusia Louwerse, Carla Mafioletti (with Guitar) and Kimmy Skota on his 2012 DVD Home for the Holidays.

Nick Lowe recorded the song for his 2013 Christmas album Quality Street: A Seasonal Selection for All the Family.

Canadian Inuk singer Susan Aglukark recorded a version that appears in her 2013 album Dreaming of Home with additional Inuktitut lyrics.

Language versions

Petit Garçon

The tune has been popular in other languages, notably it was translated to French and recorded in 1968 just one year after the English version by the New Zealand / French singer songwriter Graeme Allwright as "Petit Garçon" (meaning "little boy") in French.

It was covered in French by Greek singer Nana Mouskouri in 1972 as one of the tracks of her album Pour les enfants'''(for children).

In 2014, the song was adopted as the official tune for the annual French charity event Téléthon 2014. The Canadian French singer Garou that year's main campaign sponsor (parrain) recorded Graeme Allwright's French version "Petit garçon" with Ryan, a young French singer for official release. The song was included in Garou's new album It's Magic'' released 1 December 2014 in France. During the Téléthon, Garou sang it live accompanied by Hélène Ségara and tennisman and singer Yannick Noah.

Chart performance 
Toby Keith version

Garou & Ryan version as "Petit garçon"

References

Songs about Santa Claus
Songs about trains
1967 singles
2000 singles
Roger Miller songs
Toby Keith songs
Glen Campbell songs
Songs written by Roger Miller
Song recordings produced by Jerry Kennedy
American Christmas songs
Smash Records singles
1967 songs